Maaf Vaziri (also Romanized as Ma‘āf Vazīrī; also known as Armanī Maḩalleh and Ma‘āf) is a village in Ziabar Rural District, in the Central District of Sowme'eh Sara County, Gilan Province, Iran. At the 2006 census, its population was 137, in 37 families.

References 

Populated places in Sowme'eh Sara County